A Mandala Vaatika is a garden with architecture that is designed as per sacred geometry. The word Mandala literally means a circular, symmetrical pattern that is used in Hindu and Buddhist symbolism. The word Vaatika refers to garden, grove, parterre or plantation, and comes from Hindi and Sanskrit usage. 

In Hinduism, deities i.e. Gods and Goddesses (Devtas and Devis) are represented and invoked through unique sacred, geometrical patterns inscribed in Yantras and Mandalas. These are used during worship and meditation, and sanctified with specific rituals and offerings to bring in blessings and auspiciousness.

Ancient texts of India refer to Mandala Vaatikas that were dedicated to deities such as Lord Siddhivinaka, Goddess Durga, Goddess VaraMahalakshmi, Lord Rudra (Shiva), Lord Murugan (Karthikeya), to planets and even to constellations (Nakshatra Vana), so that individuals could meditate in these groves, and absorb higher spiritual frequencies, in their quest for deeper wisdom and an understanding of life.

Over the centuries, much of this ancient knowledge from Vedic Scriptures was lost. This was either done to wield power, or protect the sanctity of the knowledge from getting diluted or misused.

References

Gardens